The Johannesburg Art Gallery is an art gallery in Joubert Park in the city centre of Johannesburg, South Africa. It is the largest gallery on the continent with a collection that is larger than that of the Iziko South African National Gallery in Cape Town.

The building, which was completed in 1915, was designed by Sir Edwin Lutyens, with Robert Howden working as supervising architect, and consists of 15 exhibition halls and sculpture gardens. It houses collections of 17th-century Dutch paintings, 18th- and 19th-century British and European art, 19th-century South African works, a large contemporary collection of 20th-century local and international art, and a print cabinet containing works from the 15th century to the present.

Collection 

The initial collection was put together by Sir Hugh Lane, and exhibited in London in 1910 before being brought to South Africa. Florence, Lady Phillips, an art collector and wife of mining magnate Lionel Phillips, established the first gallery collection using funds donated by her husband. Lady Phillips donated her lace collection and arranged for her husband to donate seven oil paintings and a Rodin sculpture to the collection. Some other small water drawings that collected through various Galleries thought to be less valuable and have being sold for collecting funds during the late 1950s and 1960s .

In 1940, Johannesburg Art Gallery became the first South African gallery to purchase a work of art by a black artist, acquiring Yellow Houses by Gerard Sekoto. Since then, it has increasingly sought to address the colonial imbalances of its collection.

The current collection includes works by Auguste Rodin, Dante Gabriel Rossetti, Pablo Picasso, Camille Pissarro, Claude Monet, Edgar Degas, Herbert Ward and Henry Moore, and South Africans such as Gerard Sekoto, Walter Battiss, Alexis Preller, Maud Sumner, Sydney Kumalo, Ezrom Legae and Pierneef. It also houses an extensive collection of the work of contemporary local artists.

History 

The Johannesburg Art Gallery collection was opened to the public in 1910, before the gallery itself had been built, and was housed at the University of the Witwatersrand. The architect, Sir Edwin Lutyens, came to South Africa in 1910 to examine the site and begin the designs, after Lady Florence Phillips had secured funding from the city for a purpose-built museum. The building was built with a south-facing entrance, but was not completed according to the architect's designs—no part of the museum was broken down to let in the light. It was opened to the public, without ceremony, in 1915, just after the start of the First World War. The gallery was extended during the 1940s with east-west wings along the south galleries according to the Lutyens' design. The present north facade and galleries, constructed during the 1986–87 extension were designed by Meyer Pienaar and Associates.

In recent years the building has been poorly maintained, with many gallery halls closed and notable artworks removed from display.

Neighbourhood engagement 
As a major focus of urban regeneration programmes, the gallery used to provide the base for the Joubert Park Public Art Project. Today it is developing links with community centres based in the surrounding area.

Chief curators 

 P Anton Hendriks (1937–1964)
 Nel Erasmus (1964–1977)
 Pat Senior (1977–1983)
 Christopher Till (1983–1991)
 Rochelle Keene (1991–2003)
 Clive Kellner (2004–2008)
 Antoinette Murdoch (2009 – January 2017)
 Musha Nehuleni (acting curator, January 2017 – Dec 2018)
 Khwezi Gule (2019–present) http://www.702.co.za/articles/292579/meet-johannesburg-art-gallery-s-new-curator-khwezi-gule

Thefts 

 June 2002 St Thomas by El Greco.
 August 2002 Suitcase by Kendell Geers.  Sculpture recovered in a damaged state.
 1990s Talion by Gavin Younge. This large cast-bronze sculpture was commissioned by the gallery as part of its centenary celebrations in 1986. Thieves stole it by cutting bits off using a portable generator and an angle grinder fitted with a metal-cutting disc. Despite an insurance payout, the gallery never recast the missing sections.
 January 2011 General Hoche by Jules Dalou.
September 2011 Mourning Woman by Sydney Kumalo, Peter Pan by Romano Romanelli and King of the Universe by Ernest Ullman.

References

External links

Museums in Johannesburg
Art museums and galleries in South Africa
Art museums established in 1910
1910 establishments in South Africa
Works of Edwin Lutyens